The Waitaha River, also known as the Mount Cook of rivers, is a river of the West Coast region of New Zealand's South Island. One of the best whitewater rivers in New Zealand (if not the best), the hydroelectricity project has been rejected by the New Zealand government.

Waitaha is Māori and it literally means wai a river or stream taha to be passed on one side. It was named by the Waitaha, an early South Island iwi (tribe or nation) who named a number of South Island places.

The Waitaha River is renowned for gold, both alluvial and from glacial deposition. Coarse gold has been dredged downstream of Morgans Gorge where the river opens into the flats. Several gold mining operations continue in the area today.

The Morgan Gorge that is part of the Waitaha River is one of the best and most challenging whitewater kayaking places in New Zealand, and the "Mount Cook of rivers" nickname results from this. There is a proposal by Westpower Ltd to divert water from the river for power generation. The project is supported by the Mayor of Westland, Bruce Smith. It is opposed by the Royal Forest and Bird Protection Society, Whitewater NZ (the group representing the interests of kayakers and canoeists), and the Federated Mountain Clubs (FMC). The land alongside the middle and upper reaches of the river is conservation land administered by the Department of Conservation (DOC) and has "stewardship status", with puts its protection level below that of a national park. DOC had given approval in principle for a  water race to be built as a tunnel, and was to make a final decision after public hearings had finished in December 2016. The concession was denied in August 2019.

References

External links
 

Rivers of the West Coast, New Zealand
Hydroelectricity in New Zealand
Rivers of New Zealand
Westland District